Eli Isom is an American professional wrestler.  He is currently working for the American promotion Ring of Honor, where he is a member of the Shinobi Shadow Squad alongside Cheeseburger.

Professional wrestling career

Ring of Honor (2017-present) 
Isom made his debut on November 12, 2017, losing to Shane Taylor at Ring of Honor.

On December 10, 2022, Isom and Cheeseburger were defeated by Angelo Parker and Matt Menard during the Final Battle pre-show.

All Elite Wrestling (2022) 
On April 27, 2022, Isom made his AEW debut on Dark: Elevation. He made his AEW Dynamite debut on September 28, losing to Ricky Starks.

References

External links 

 

21st-century professional wrestlers
American male professional wrestlers
Living people
Year of birth missing (living people)
Professional wrestlers from Indiana
All Elite Wrestling personnel